Anthela acuta, the common anthelid moth, is a moth of the family Anthelidae first described by Francis Walker in 1855. It is found in Australia.

References

Moths described in 1855
Anthelidae